Cante dei Gabrielli di Gubbio (c. 1260 – c. 1335) was an Italian nobleman and condottiero.

Biography

Cante was born in Gubbio to a powerful Guelph feudal family. He held several high offices as Podestà in a number of cities in Tuscany and Umbria (Florence, Pistoia, Siena, Lucca, Orvieto) and was lord of Gubbio, Cantiano and other castles. In 1317 he was appointed by Pope John XXII as Commander-in-Chief of the Church's army, at the head of which he defeated the Ghibellines at Assisi and Urbino, thus re-establishing the Pope's supremacy in central Italy.

He is mostly famous for having exiled from Florence Dante Alighieri, the famous poet, while serving as Podestà of that city (1301–1302). Dante took vengeance on him by giving Cante's disguised name to Rubicante, one of the Malebranche demons the poet encounters in the bolgia of barratry, as described in his masterwork the Divine Comedy (Inf. XXI vv. 118-123).

Over the centuries, literati have recognized that Dante's condemnation to exile was the necessary catalyst for what is today regarded as the pre-eminent work in Italian literature, the most important poem of the Middle Ages, and one of the greatest works of world literature. Along this line, in 1874 Giosuè Carducci addressed a sonnet to Cante de' Gabrielli, acknowledging his role as the main responsible for Dante's inspiration (A Messer Cante Gabrielli da Gubbio, Podestà di Firenze nel MCCCI).
 
In the domain of visual arts, Frederic Leighton was reportedly inspired by Cante dei Gabrielli's life when he painted his Condottiere (1871-1872), today at the Birmingham Museum and Art Gallery.

Notes

See also 
 Palazzo di Cante dei Gabrielli at Gubbio

References 
 Daniel E. Bornstein. Dino Compagni's Chronicle of Florence. Philadelphia, PA: University of Pennsylvania Press, 1986
 Thomas Caldecot Chubb. Dante and his world. Boston, MA: Little, Brown and Company, 1966
 William Anderson. Dante the maker. Brooklyn, NY: S4N Books, 2010

1260s births
1330s deaths
People from Gubbio
14th-century condottieri
Italian untitled nobility
Dante Alighieri
13th-century condottieri
Podestàs of Florence